The 2015 FIFA Women's World Cup was the seventh FIFA Women's World Cup, the quadrennial international soccer championship contested by the women's national teams of the member associations of FIFA. The tournament was hosted by Canada for the first time and by a North American country for the third time. Matches were played in six cities across Canada in five time zones. The tournament began on 6 June 2015, and finished with the final on 5 July 2015 with a United States victory over Japan.

The 2015 tournament saw the World Cup expanded to 24 teams from 16 in 2011. Canada's team received direct entry as host and a qualification tournament of 134 teams was held for the remaining 23 places. With the expanded tournament, eight teams made their Women's World Cup debut. All previous Women's World Cup finalists qualified for the tournament, with defending champions Japan and returning champions Germany (2003, 2007) and the United States (1991, 1999) among the seeded teams.

The 2015 tournament used goal-line technology for the first time with the Hawk-Eye system. It was also the first World Cup for either men or women to be played on artificial turf, with all matches played on such surfaces, even though there were some initial concerns over a possible increased risk of injuries.

Host selection
The bidding for each FIFA Women's World Cup typically includes hosting rights for the previous year's FIFA U-20 Women's World Cup (similar to the men's version, in which the host nation stages the Confederations Cup the year before). Bids for the tournament were required to be submitted by December 2010. Only two bids were submitted:

Zimbabwe withdrew its bid on 1 March 2011. The country was seen as a long shot as its women's team was ranked 103rd in the world at the time of the bid and has never qualified for a Women's World Cup. There was also ongoing political and economic instability in the country.

The selected host, Canada, had previously hosted FIFA tournaments including the 1987 FIFA U-16 World Championship, 2002 FIFA U-19 Women's World Championship, the 2007 FIFA U-20 World Cup, which set an attendance record for that tournament, and most recently the 2014 FIFA U-20 Women's World Cup.

Qualification

For 2015, the number of qualifying teams grew from 16 to 24 and scheduled matches increased from 32 to 52. On 11 June 2012, FIFA announced a change to the allocation of the qualifying berths for its continental confederations. The FIFA Executive Committee approved the following slot allocation and the distribution of eight new slots:

After North Korea had several players test positive for performance-enhancing drugs during the 2011 FIFA Women's World Cup, FIFA banned the North Korean team from participating in the 2015 FIFA Women's World Cup in Canada. This was the first time a team had been banned from a Women's World Cup, and it was the first time since 1995 that North Korea did not participate in a Women's World Cup.

Qualified teams
The latest published FIFA Rankings prior to the tournament (March 2015) are shown in brackets.

 AFC (5)
  (10)
  (16)
  (4)
  (18)
  (29) (debut)
 CAF (3)
  (53) (debut)
  (67) (debut)
  (33)

 CONCACAF (4)
  (8) (hosts)
  (37) (debut)
  (25)
  (2)
 CONMEBOL (3)
  (7)
  (28)
  (48) (debut)
 OFC (1)
  (17)

 UEFA (8)
  (6)
  (3)
  (1)
  (12) (debut)
  (11)
  (14) (debut)
  (5)
  (19) (debut)

Venues
The cities of Vancouver, Edmonton, Winnipeg, Ottawa, Montreal and Moncton were selected to host tournament matches. Halifax was also considered, but removed itself from contention in March 2012. Toronto decided not to bid, due to potential conflicts with the 2015 Pan American Games. Due to FIFA's policy against commercial sponsorship of stadium names, Investors Group Field in Winnipeg and TD Place Stadium in Ottawa were respectively known as Winnipeg Stadium and Lansdowne Stadium during the tournament. Seating capacities shown in table below are as configured for these FIFA games.

Innovations
The tournament introduced goal-line technology with the Hawk-Eye system by which it is possible to show on the stadium screen if the ball was in or not. It was also the first World Cup for either men or women to be played on artificial turf, with all matches played on such surfaces. There were some initial concerns (please see below) over a possible increased risk of injuries from playing on artificial turf, but a legal challenge suggesting matches should be played on grass as in similar men's tournaments was dropped in January 2015.

Squads

Each team's squad for the 2015 FIFA Women's World Cup consisted of 23 players (three of whom must be goalkeepers), two more than the 2011 tournament, and the same number as men's World Cup squads. Each participating national association was required to confirm its final 23-player squad no later than 10 working days before the start of the tournament. Replacement of seriously injured players was permitted until 24 hours before the team in question's first World Cup game.

The squads were officially announced by FIFA on 28 May 2015. Formiga of Brazil and Homare Sawa of Japan were included in World Cup squads for the sixth time, a record for any men or women players.

Match officials
A total of 29 referees/support referees and 44 assistant referees were selected for the tournament.

Draw
The draw was held on 6 December 2014 at 12:00 Eastern Standard Time at the Canadian Museum of Nature in Ottawa, Ontario, Canada. The seeding pots were announced the day before. Because UEFA qualified eight teams into the final tournament, which had only six groups, two groups by necessity had to contain two European teams. Otherwise, no group could have more than one team from any confederation. Despite having a lower FIFA ranking than Sweden and England, Brazil was seeded ahead of both for "geographical reasons". Before the draw, the Organizing Committee placed the seeded teams in the following groups: Germany in Group B, Japan in Group C, United States in Group D, Brazil in Group E, and France in Group F; Canada were already in Group A as the tournament host. Not drawing the groups for the seeded teams has drawn some criticism. A FIFA spokesperson later confirmed that teams were allocated to certain groups for promotional reasons.

Group stage
 

The 24 teams of the tournament were arranged into 6 groups labelled A to F. The provisional match schedule for the tournament was released on 21 March 2013, with the hosts, Canada, placed in position A1. The final schedule with match times was released on the same day right after the draw was made.

The first round, or group stage, saw the twenty four teams divided into six groups of four teams. Each group was played in a round-robin-format of six games, where each team played one match against each of the other teams in the same group. Teams were awarded three points for a win, one point for a draw and none for a defeat. The winners and runners-up from each group, as well as the best four third-placed teams, qualified for the first round of the knockout stage.

Group A

Group B

Group C

Group D

Group E

Group F

Ranking of third-placed teams
The four best third-placed teams from the six groups advanced to the knockout stage along with the six group winners and six runners-up.

Knockout stage

The knockout stage comprised the 16 teams that advanced from the group stage of the tournament. There were four rounds of matches, with each round eliminating half of the teams entering that round. The successive rounds were the round of 16, quarter-finals, semi-finals, and the final. There was also a match to decide third and fourth place. For each game in the knockout stage, any draw at 90 minutes was followed by 30 minutes of extra time; if scores were still level, there was a penalty shootout to determine who progressed to the next round. Single yellow cards accrued were cancelled after the quarter-finals, therefore ensuring that no players miss the Final because of receiving a caution in the semi-finals.

Three spots in the 2016 Summer Olympics women's football tournament were filled by the UEFA teams that progressed the furthest in the tournament, other than England. Two spots went to France and Germany which both reached the quarter-finals. The third spot was a tie between four teams eliminated in the round of 16: Netherlands, Norway, Sweden and Switzerland. A play-off tournament in March 2016 determined UEFA's third Olympic qualifier to be Sweden.

Bracket

Round of 16

Quarter-finals

Semi-finals

Third place play-off

Final

Awards

The following awards were given at the conclusion of the tournament. The Golden Ball (best overall player), Golden Boot (top scorer) and Golden Glove (best goalkeeper) awards were sponsored by Adidas, while the Best Young Player and Goal of the Tournament awards were sponsored by Hyundai Motor Company. FIFA.com shortlisted twelve goals for users to vote on as the tournaments' best, with the poll closing on 13 July 2015.

On 2 July 2015, following the semi-finals, FIFA announced the shortlists for three of the tournament awards. The following candidates were ultimately not selected:
Golden Ball: Saori Ariyoshi (Japan), Lucy Bronze (England), Julie Johnston (United States), Megan Rapinoe (United States), Célia Šašić (Germany)
Golden Glove: Nadine Angerer (Germany), Ayumi Kaihori (Japan)
Best Young Player: Ada Hegerberg (Norway), Tang Jiali (China PR)

All-Star Squad
The All-Star Squad elected by FIFA's Technical Study Group consists of the following players:

Dream Team
The Dream Team elected by users of fifa.com consists of the following players and manager:

Prize money
The total prize money offered by FIFA for the tournament was US$15 million, which represents 2.6% of the total prize money for the 2014 Men's World Cup ($576 million). The winning team, United States, received $2 million, representing 5.7% of the amount received by Germany for winning the 2014 Men's World Cup ($35 million).

Statistics

Goalscorers

Assists

Tournament ranking

Controversies
All of the tournament's venues had fields composed of artificial turf, which some players believe results in a higher risk of injuries to players. More than 50 players protested the use of the surface instead of grass on the basis of gender discrimination. They filed a lawsuit challenging FIFA's decision to play on artificial turf, claiming FIFA would never allow the men's World Cup to be played on "unsafe" artificial turf and thus the organizers had violated the Canadian Human Rights Act. 2012 Women's World Player of the Year Abby Wambach noted "The men would strike playing on artificial turf." The controversial issue of gender equality and an equal playing field for all sparked debate in many countries around the world. An application filed on 1 October 2014 with the Ontario Human Rights Tribunal by a group of women's international soccer players against FIFA and the Canadian Soccer Association noted that, in 1994, FIFA spent $2 million to plant natural grass over artificial turf in New Jersey and Detroit. Some celebrities and prominent players showed their support for the women soccer players in defence of their lawsuit, including United States men's team keeper Tim Howard. Even with the possibility of boycotts, FIFA's head of women's competitions, Tatjana Haenni, made it clear "We play on artificial turf and there's no Plan B." In January 2015, the lawsuit was withdrawn by the players.

Fox commentator Julie Stewart-Binks measured the turf temperature at several games. On 21 June at the Canada vs Switzerland round of 16 game in Vancouver, she reported that her thermometer was "officially broken".

During the tournament, Australian striker Michelle Heyman slammed the playing conditions, saying the turf is like "walking on hot coals" and the players feet "just turn white, your skin is all ripped off".

Despite such dangerous conditions, officials decided against taking cooling breaks during the match because the air temperature was under . As the game wore on, players appeared noticeably exhausted due to the playing conditions.

Attendance was largely inflated by FIFA as single tickets were sold for double-headers during the group stages. "This allows FIFA to report the combined attendance for both matches as the attendance for each match when in reality the true attendance for one or both matches is likely to be much different."

Broadcasting

The 2015 FIFA Women's World Cup was one of the first FIFA tournaments under new rights deals in two North American markets. In its host country of Canada, Bell Media acquired the broadcast rights; the competition was televised by CTV and TSN in English, as well as Réseau des sports (RDS) in French. In the United States, English-language television rights were held by Fox Sports with coverage carried on the main Fox broadcast network, along with the Fox Sports 1 and Fox Sports 2 pay TV channels. Spanish-language rights were held by Telemundo and sister cable network NBC Universo. Fox constructed a temporary studio for the Women's World Cup at Jack Poole Plaza in Vancouver, located outside the Vancouver Convention Centre.

In December 2014, the European Broadcasting Union extended its rights to FIFA tournaments for its members in 37 countries, including the 2015 Women's World Cup. In the United Kingdom, all matches from the tournament were shown by the BBC via BBC One, BBC Two, BBC Three and BBC Red Button on TV and Radio 5 Live on radio. In Australia, SBS aired all 52 matches live online, and televised 41 matches live, with the only matches not televised live being those which aired concurrently.

Mascot and sponsors
On 17 June 2014, the mascot of the tournament, Shuéme, a female great white owl was unveiled at the Canadian Museum of Nature in Ottawa.

The five top-tier sponsors were Coca-Cola, Adidas, Hyundai–Kia, Visa, and Gazprom. In the final week of the tournament, the Canadian government added Gazprom to a list of organizations sanctioned for supporting the Russian annexation of Crimea. Media suggested the addition was delayed to reduce embarrassment to FIFA.

See also
 2014 FIFA World Cup

Notes

References

External links

 FIFA Women's World Cup Canada 2015, FIFA.com
 FIFA Technical Report
 FIFA Physical Analysis
 Results at RSSSF

 
World Cup
FIFA Women's World Cup
2015
Fifa Women's World Cup
International women's association football competitions hosted by Canada
June 2015 sports events in Canada
July 2015 sports events in Canada